Queen Elizabeth High School is a comprehensive school for  Carmarthen town and its surrounding areas.

History

The school was formed in September 2005 by the joining together of Queen Elizabeth Maridunum School and Queen Elizabeth Cambria School, which were located within 300m of each other.

In September 2008, Daniyal Shahzad, a Pakistani national falsely claiming his name was Ahmer Rana, became a pupil at the school. Lodging with foster parents, on investigation in 2010 by the UK Border Agency, he claimed that he had no family. He was subject to a deportation order, and the school became the centre of a campaign to allow him to stay in the UK, which resulted in a 4,000 signature petition being collected and presented to Gordon Brown. After further investigation by S4C's current affairs programme 'Y Byd ar Bedwar'  his true identity was revealed. Shahzad was deported to Pakistan on 1 June 2011.

Notable former pupils

 Emrys G. Bowen - Professor of Geography, Aberystwyth
 Charles Lynn Davies - Welsh international rugby player
 Denzil Davies - MP for Llanelli
 Mark Drakeford - leader of the Welsh Labour Party and First Minister of Wales
 Richard Edwards - Member of the National Assembly for Wales for Preseli, Pembrokeshire
 Ieuan Evans - Welsh international rugby player
 Rhod Gilbert - comedian
 Frederick Farey-Jones - MP for Watford
 Thomas Jones-Davies - heart specialist and Welsh international rugby player
 Percy Lloyd - Welsh international rugby player
 William Norton - Welsh international rugby player
 Terence Thomas, Baron Thomas of Macclesfield - banker and politician
 Sir David Williams - barrister and past vice-chancellor of University of Cambridge

References

External links
Queen Elizabeth High School
Old website archived

Secondary schools in Carmarthenshire